Sir Howard Warburton Elphinstone, 3rd Baronet (26 July 1830 Westminster – 3 January 1917, Wimbledon Park) was an English baronet and legal academic.

He was the eldest son of Sir Howard Elphinstone, 2nd Baronet, and educated at Eton and Trinity College, Cambridge, where he took a scholarship. In his thirties, he was called to the Bar at Lincoln's Inn, later becoming a lecturer for the Law Society and then the Professor of Real Property Law to the Inns of Court.

On 4 August 1860 he married Constance Mary Alexander Hankey, third daughter of John Alexander Hankey. They had six sons and five daughters. He was succeeded in the baronetcy by his grandson, Howard Graham Elphinstone, the son of Graham Warburton Elphinstone, the 3rd baronet's second son:
Howard John Elphinstone (b.1862); who married in 1889 Katherine Curteis, and had issue.
Graham Warburton Elphinstone (b. 1866); who married in 1896 Susan Harley, daughter of H. C. R. Harley, og India, and had children including Howard Graham Elphinstone, who succeeded his grandfather.
Rev. Maurice Curteis Elphinstone (b. 1874).
Kenneth Vaughan Elphinstone (b. 1878), a colonial official.
Sir Lancelot Henry Elphinstone (1879–1965).
Constance Julia Elphinstone; who married in 1889 Captain John Russell Compton Domvile (d. 1893), and had issue.
Frances Mary Elphinstone ; who married in 1891 Edward Alfred Chandler, and had issue.
Isabel Harriet Elphinstone
Selina Beatrice Elphinstone; who married at the Anglican Cathedral in Bloemfontein on 26 December 1902 Charles O'Brien, who was later Governor of Seychelles and knighted as a KCMG.
Gladys Christine Elphinstone

References

Obituary: p. 151, The Annual Register: a review of public events at home and abroad, for the year 1917. London: Longmans, Green and Co. 1918.

External links

1830 births
1917 deaths
Baronets in the Baronetage of the United Kingdom
People educated at Eton College
Alumni of Trinity College, Cambridge
Members of Lincoln's Inn
Presidents of the Cambridge Union
English barristers